The 1949 Utah Redskins football team was an American football team that represented the University of Utah as a member of the Skyline Six Conference during the 1949 college football season. In their 25th and final season under head coach Ike Armstrong, the Redskins compiled an overall record of 2–7–1 with a mark of 2–3 against conference opponents, winning placing fourth in the Skyline Six.

Schedule

After the season

NFL Draft
Utah had one player selected in the 1950 NFL Draft.

References

Utah
Utah Utes football seasons
Utah Redskins football